Naval Construction Battalion Center is a  U.S. Navy industrial complex located in Gulfport, Mississippi. It serves as home base for the Atlantic Fleet Seabees, which are the Navy's construction battalions.

Mission
The mission of the Naval Construction Battalion Center (CBC) Gulfport is:

History

On June 2, 1942, an Advanced Base Depot was established in Gulfport and the first Seabees arrived.  Defense planning during the early years of World War II called for a deep-water port to serve the Caribbean region. Gulfport had the necessary port facility, as well as a semi-tropical climate for year-round training and shipping.  A school was set up for Battalions passing through to be trained for the Malaria and Epidemic Control Group of BUMED.

Also assigned to Gulfport was one of the Navy's three Naval Armed Guards Training Centers.  HQ for the Navy's Armed Guards was in New Orleans.  The Armed Guards manned the deck guns of Merchant vessels under contract to the Navy.

On March 21, 1944, Camp Hollyday was disestablished and the base changed to a Naval Training Center for ratings in basic engineering, diesel engine, radio, quartermaster, and electrician. The electrician school was 17 weeks.  In 1946 the Training Center was decommissioned.  On 23 October 1945 Bureau of Yards and Docks (BuDocks) transferred the base to the Bureau of Supplies and Accounts.  The complex was re-designated a Naval Storehouse facility for stockpiling bauxite, tin, copper, sisal and abacá.  In 1952, the Naval Storehouse was disestablished with the base transferred back to BuDocks.  It was then designated as a U.S. Naval Construction Battalion Center.

In the mid-1960s, there was an increasing need for naval construction forces in Southeast Asia.  To meet that need, the Naval Construction Battalion Center expanded in both military and civilian personnel and continued to serve as a training facility through the latter half of the 20th century.

During the Vietnam War, NCBC Gulfport was the largest storage site in the United States for agent orange prior to shipment to Southeast Asia. In 1968, the base received 68,700 55-gallon barrels of herbicide for shipment to Vietnam. Long-term storage of barrels began in 1969 and lasted until 1977.

In 1969, before, during, and after the landfall of Hurricane Camille, 1700 Seabees from NCBC Gulfport helped the surrounding communities prepare for and recover from the hurricane.   NCBC served as a recovery center providing a staging site for over 500 Georgia Power repairmen and highway crews.  Damage to the base was extensive with 25 structures completely destroyed. The Governor of Mississippi tasked the NCBC with the recovery of the area from Gulfport to west of Bay St. Louis.  That area was ground zero for Camille's landfall. Pass Christian was assigned to the 121st CB with the battalion setting up camp there, working round the clock in two 12-hour shifts. The military and civilian personnel received numerous medals and commendations from the Navy and local officials.  When it was over the NCBC and CBs 74 and 121 all received Navy Unit Commendations.  Mississippi Governor John Bell Williams declared October 31, 1969 as "Seabees Awards Day".

On August 29, 2005 Hurricane Katrina arrived at Gulfport for a two-day stay.  The congressional appropriations to repair the damages of those two days was 277.2 million dollars for the NCBC and Stennis Space Center.  "Seabee commanders integrated into Gulf Coast county emergency operations centers (EOCs) during the Katrina recovery and helped elected officials prioritize recovery work and align assets for response. These efforts were indicative of the working relationship that has always existed between the Seabees and the Gulf Coast community, according to CBC Commanding Officer Capt. George E. Eichert."  All military personnel attached to the NCBC during the recovery received the Armed Forces Service Medal and the Humanitarian Service Medal  All the civilians employed by the NCBC received  the Armed Forces Civilian Service Medal.

In the first decade of the 21st century, the center was serving more than 4,000 active duty personnel and their families, plus approximately 1,000 Department of Defense civilian personnel.

In 2015, Cheryl Hansen became the first female commander of the Naval Construction Battalion Center.

Home-port to 
Naval Construction Group TWO
22nd Naval Construction Regiment
Naval Mobile Construction Battalion ONE
Naval Mobile Construction Battalion 11
Naval Mobile Construction Battalion 14
Naval Mobile Construction Battalion 133

See also

Admiral Ben Moreell
Amphibious Construction Battalion One (ACB-1)
Amphibious Construction Battalion TWO (ACB-2)
Civil Engineer Corps United States Navy
List of United States Navy installations
Naval Construction Battalion
Naval Mobile Construction Battalion 1
Naval Mobile Construction Battalion 3
Naval Mobile Construction Battalion 4
Naval Mobile Construction Battalion 5
Naval Mobile Construction Battalion 11
Naval Mobile Construction Battalion 133
Naval Construction Battalion Center Port Hueneme
Naval Amphibious Base Little Creek
Naval Amphibious Base Coronado
Seabee
Seabees in World War II
Underwater Construction Teams 1 & 2

References

External links

 Website Naval Construction Battalion Center Gulfport Retrieved 2012-12-29

Military installations in Mississippi
Buildings and structures in Gulfport, Mississippi
United States Navy installations
1942 establishments in Mississippi